Fredua Buadee Benson Erchiah (born 10 April 1984) is a professional footballer who plays as a striker. He most recently played for RKC Waalwijk.

Club career

In January 2005 Benson was promoted to the Eredivisie team from Vitesse Arnhem. In two years, he played 62 games, scoring 14 goals before transferring to RKC Waalwijk in July 2007.

On 11 February 2010, it was announced that Benson had joined Shandong Luneng on a five-month-long loan deal.

In July 2011 Benson joined Lechia Gdańsk on a two-year contract. In total for Lechia he made 12 appearances, 11 of which came in the Ekstraklasa. His debut came against Jagiellonia Białystok, with his first and only goal coming against Cracovia, making him the first Lechia Gdańsk player and overall first player to score in the newly built PGE Arena Gdańsk. After a run of 10 games without a goal Benson was deemed as surplus to requirements and wasn't picked for the first training camp of the winter break. Knowing his time would be limited Benson chose to terminate his contract with mutual agreement in January 2012.

On 20 June 2014, Benson signed for Moldovan side FC Sheriff Tiraspol.

Six months later, on 23 January 2015, Benson left Sheriff Tiraspol by mutual consent. Shortly after leaving Sheriff Tiraspol, Benson signed a six-month contract with Rapid București.

In summer 2016, Benson returned to RKC after spending time in Dutch amateur football with IJsselmeervogels. Benson initially moved to ASV De Dijk on 25 January 2018, but the transfer was later rejected.

International career
In 2006, he was part of the Netherlands squad that won the UEFA U-21 Championship 2006 in Portugal.

Career statistics

Club

Honours

Club
RKC Waalwijk
Eerste Divisie (1): 2010–11
PEC Zwolle
KNVB Cup (1): 2013–14

References

External links
 
 Voetbal International profile 

1984 births
Living people
Footballers from Accra
Association football forwards
Dutch footballers
Ghanaian footballers
Dutch sportspeople of Ghanaian descent
A.V.V. Zeeburgia players
SBV Vitesse players
RKC Waalwijk players
Shandong Taishan F.C. players
Lechia Gdańsk players
PEC Zwolle players
FC Sheriff Tiraspol players
FC Rapid București players
IJsselmeervogels players
Eredivisie players
Eerste Divisie players
Chinese Super League players
Ekstraklasa players
Moldovan Super Liga players
Liga I players
Derde Divisie players
Dutch expatriate footballers
Dutch expatriate sportspeople in China
Expatriate footballers in China
Dutch expatriate sportspeople in Poland
Expatriate footballers in Poland
Dutch expatriate sportspeople in Moldova
Expatriate footballers in Moldova
Dutch expatriate sportspeople in Romania
Expatriate footballers in Romania
Netherlands under-21 international footballers